Naikan (Japanese: 内観) is a structured method of self-reflection developed by Yoshimoto Ishin (1916–1988) in the 1940s. The practice is based around asking oneself three questions about a person in one's life:

 What did I receive from this person?
 What did I return to this person?
 What troubles, worries, unhappiness did I cause this person?

There are many forms of Naikan practice, all focusing on these three questions. The most rigorous form of Naikan is practiced in week-long Naikan retreats, which start by focusing on the three questions on the individual's relationship to their mother.  The questions can then later be expanded outwards to other relationships.  During the sessions a guide comes and listens to the participant from time to time allowing them to put into words what they have discovered.

A related fourth question, "What troubles and difficulties has this person caused me?", is purposely ignored in Naikan. Naikan presupposes that people are naturally able to see answers to this fourth question, and that too much focus on this question is responsible for unhappiness in day-to-day life.

History
Yoshimoto Ishin was a businessman and devout Jodo Shinshu Buddhist who, as a young man, had engaged in an ascetic contrition (mishirabe) practice involving sensory deprivation, by dwelling in a dark cave without food, water or sleep. Wishing to make such introspection available to others he developed Naikan as a less difficult method which he first introduced to young people who had been incarcerated for committing crime and social disturbances.  Later the practice was introduced to the general public. Naikan practitioners claim that Naikan helps people understand themselves and their relationships.

Today, there are around 30 Naikan centers in Japan, and it is used in mental health counseling, and in rehabilitation of prisoners. The practice has also taken root in Europe, with Naikan centers now established in Austria and Germany.

The mishirabe practices from which Naikan is derived are also still conducted in a religious context within some Jodo Shinshu temples and communities but the harsh, ascetic nature of Yoshimoto Ishin's original practice is unusual given the Jodo Shinshu rejection of self-power practice.

Self-reflection 

The practice of self-reflection goes back many centuries and is rooted in the world’s great spiritual traditions. Early adherents of such practices include the Christian desert hermits and Japanese samurai. More contemporary proponents included Albert Schweitzer, Ben Franklin, and Bishop Fulton J. Sheen. Franklin, in particular, had a rather comprehensive and systematic approach to self-reflection. He developed a list of thirteen virtues and each day he would evaluate his conduct relative to a particular virtue. Daily self-reflection was a fundamental aspect of Franklin’s life.

Formal methods of self-reflection generally involve certain basic characteristics. First, there is the requirement for time which is set aside exclusively for the purpose of self-reflection. Second, use of a space, preferably with some degree of isolation that limits external distraction. And third, the application of questions or structure which helps us examine our lives with an emphasis on our conduct in relation to other people, creatures and objects.

Its structure uses our relationships with others as the mirror in which people can see themselves. We reflect on what we have received from others, what we have given, and what troubles we have caused.

The family-relationship focus of traditional Naikan may sometimes be less appropriate to those with fragmented or seriously dysfunctional family backgrounds. However, as with Buddhist metta meditation (mettā bhāvanā), there is no reason why Naikan practice need necessarily take family relationships as starting point.  The benefit of looking at family relationships is that these are often most emotionally complex and connected with our sense of 'self' .

References

Bibliography 
 Chikako Ozawa-de Silva (2007). Demystifying Japanese Therapy: An Analysis of Naikan and the Ajase Complex through Buddhist Thought, Ethos 35, (4),  411–446

Mental health in Japan
Jōdo Shinshū